Madiha is an Arabic female given name.

Madiha may also refer to:
 Madiha people, commonly called Kulina people, of Brazil and Peru
 Madiha language or Kulina language, spoken by the Kulina
 Madiha Maliha, Pakistani telenovela